Manuel Navarro may refer to:
Manuel Navarro Luna (1894-1966), Cuban poet
Manuel Aparici Navarro (1902-1964), Spanish priest
Manu Navarro (born 2000), Spanish footballer
Manuel Antonio Navarro, Spanish actor

See also
Manel Navarro (born 1996), Spanish singer